The 1882–83 season was the second season in which Bolton Wanderers competed in a senior competitive football competition. The club entered the FA Cup in November 1882, but were knocked out in the third round by the Welsh club Druids.

F.A. Cup

See also
Bolton Wanderers F.C. seasons

References

1881-82
Bolton Wanderers F.C.